Zygmunt Krumholz (1 March 1903 – 20 July 1947) was a Polish footballer. He played in one match for the Poland national football team in 1922.

References

External links
 

1903 births
1947 deaths
Polish footballers
Poland international footballers
Place of birth missing
Association footballers not categorized by position